The 1935 Xavier Musketeers football team was an American football team that represented Xavier University as an independent during the 1935 college football season. The team compiled a 6–3 record, shut out six of nine opponents, and outscored all opponents by a total of 164 to 35. The team played its home games at Corcoran Field in Cincinnati.

The team began the season under head coach Joseph A. Meyer who had been the head coach since 1920.  After the team lost two of its first three games, Meyer resigned and was replaced by Clem Crowe. Crowe had been the head basketball coach and an assistant football coach on Meyer's staff. Crowe coached the final six games, including five victories.

Schedule

References

Xavier
Xavier Musketeers football seasons
Xavier Musketeers football